Shark Fights was a mixed martial arts promotion based in Amarillo, Texas. It made its debut on October 24, 2008. On September 11, 2010 Shark Fights had its biggest card in Shark Fights history by having past and present UFC fighters Jorge Masvidal, Keith Jardine, Rameau Thierry Sokoudjou, Paul Daley, and Houston Alexander all on the same card. It last hosted an event on November 11, 2011.

Events

Final champions

References

External links
 Official website

Mixed martial arts organizations
Mixed martial arts events lists